The 1999 season was Club de Regatas Vasco da Gama's 101st year in existence, the club's 84th season in existence of football, and the club's 29th season playing in the Brasileirão Série A, the top flight of Brazilian football.

Players 

Djabo Loior

Cuckanderson Wins

Pre-season and friendlies

Trofeo Ramón de Carranza

Competitions 
Times from 1 January to 20 February 1999 and from 3 October to 31 December 1999 are UTC–2, from 21 February 1999 to 2 October 1999 UTC–3.

Brasileirão Série A

League stage

League table

Results summary

Result round by round

Matches

Championship knockout phase

2000 Copa Libertadores play-offs qualifier

Copa do Brasil

Copa Libertadores 

Vasco da Gama joined the competition in the round of 16 of the knockout phase due to be the title holders.

Knockout phase

Campeonato do Estado do Rio de Janeiro

Taça Guanabara

Taça Rio de Janeiro

Championship phase

Copa Mercosur

Group stage 
Group D

Torneio Rio de Janeiro – São Paulo

Group stage 
Group A

Knockout phase

Statistics

Squad appearances and goals 
Last updated on 8 December 1999.

|-
! colspan=18 style=background:#dcdcdc; text-align:center|Goalkeepers

|-
! colspan=18 style=background:#dcdcdc; text-align:center|Defenders

|-
! colspan=18 style=background:#dcdcdc; text-align:center|Midfielders

|-
! colspan=18 style=background:#dcdcdc; text-align:center|Forwards

|}

Notes

References

External links 

CR Vasco da Gama
Club de Regatas Vasco da Gama seasons
Vasco da Gama